Puelche or Puelches may refer to:
Puelche people, an indigenous people of Argentina and Chile
Puelche language, spoken by the Puelche people
Puelche (wind), a dry wind of Chile
Puelches, La Pampa, a village in Argentina